Natalie Louise Tobin (born 13 October 1996) is an Australian football (soccer) player, who plays as a midfielder for Sydney FC in the Australian W-League.

Club career

Sydney FC

In May 2021, it was announced that Tobin would join Perth Glory for the 2021–22 W-League season. However, three months later her plans to move to Perth were put on hold, and she re-signed with Sydney FC, being appointed as captain, following Teresa Polias taking a break.

References

1996 births
Living people
Australian women's soccer players
Sydney FC (A-League Women) players
A-League Women players
Women's association football midfielders